The Patscher Spitze is a mountain of the Rieserferner group on the border between Tyrol, Austria, and South Tyrol, Italy.

References 
 Alpenverein South Tyrol

External links 

Mountains of the Alps
Mountains of Tyrol (state)
Mountains of South Tyrol
Alpine three-thousanders
Rieserferner Group
Austria–Italy border
International mountains of Europe
Rieserferner-Ahrn Nature Park
Geography of East Tyrol